Coridon may refer to:
Coridon (company), a biotechnology company founded by Australian scientist Ian Frazer
One of the title characters in the Broadside ballad "Coridon and Parthenia"
A character in the Venetian tragicomedy Il pastor fido
A character in the 1718 version of Handel's Acis and Galatea
A character in Purcell's opera The Fairy Queen
A character in the Italian literary fairy tale The Pig King

People with the surname, given name, or nickname Coridon include:
Johannes Glauber (1646–1726), nicknamed Coridon, Dutch Golden Age painter
Charles-Édouard Coridon (born 1973), Martiniquais footballer

See also
Lysandra coridon, a species of butterfly
Cordon (disambiguation)
Corridon, Missouri